Kenan Sofuoğlu (born 25 August 1984 in Kuzuluk, Akyazı) is a Turkish parliamentarian and former professional motorcycle racer. He holds a record five Supersport World Championship titles (2007, 2010, 2012, 2015 and 2016). Sofuoğlu also competed at the Superbike World Championship in 2008 and at the Moto2 World Championship in 2010 and 2011.

Sofuoğlu announced his retirement from racing in May 2018, and became an elected politician in June 2018. He made a brief comeback appearance at the Imola, Italy, World Championship event on 13 May where he qualified in third place but entered the pit lane immediately after the sighting lap, choosing to withdraw from the race. 

He suffered injuries in a crash at Phillip Island, Australia, earlier in 2018, exacerbating his previous pelvis fracture from a crash during practice at Magny-Cours, France, on 30 September 2017, which initially appeared to have ended participation in the 2017 season. After a period of only five weeks, he returned to participate in the last meeting at Qatar, finishing the race in third place and totalling enough points to finish second in the championship. 

He raced in the World Superbike Championship for Ten Kate in 2008, but with limited success.

Racing for Kawasaki in 2012, Sofuoğlu claimed his third Supersport World Championship at the Portuguese Grand Prix, in the penultimate race.

As a five-time champion, Sofuoglu is the most successful rider to have competed in the Supersport World Championship and holds many records in the class.

Career

Supersport & Superbike World Championship
After winning Class B of the Turkish Supersport Championship in 2000 and the German Yamaha R6 Cup in 2002, Sofuoğlu moved into the European Superstock Championship, finishing second and third in two seasons. Subsequently, Sofuoğlu entered the Supersport World Championship full-time in 2006 after three races in 2003. Sofuoğlu dominated the 2007 season, winning five of the first eight races, and broke the record for the most wins in one season. These included a two-lap charge from sixth to first at Monza, and a win on his first ever visit to Donington Park, in the wet. He also won at Losail, Spain and Assen, Netherlands. He clinched the championship with three races to go, by finishing second at Brands Hatch, becoming Turkey's first major motorsport world champion.

Sofuoğlu then signed with Ten Kate Honda for three more years. For 2008 he rode a 3rd Ten Kate Honda CBR1000RR in World Superbikes, as part of a junior team. He was not successful, and returned to Supersport with the team for 2009. This time the team struggled to match Cal Crutchlow's Yamaha and the Parkalgar Honda of Eugene Laverty, leaving Sofuoğlu to fight for third in the standings. He opened 2010 with a succession of podium finishes, leaving him in a 3-way championship battle with Laverty and Motocard Kawasaki's Joan Lascorz. He eventually claimed the title, finishing on the podium in every race.

For 2013, as the world champion, Sofuoğlu had the option of riding for the Italian Pedercini Team but he opted to join the Indian Mahi Team owned by Mahendra Singh Dhoni.

Moto2 World Championship
Towards the end of the 2010 season Sofuoğlu appeared in Moto2 at the Portuguese Grand Prix, with the Technomag-CIP team, replacing Shoya Tomizawa, who had died in an incident at Misano. Sofuoğlu was fourth fastest in practice, which put him on the front row after qualifying was rained out. The race marked his first ever dry laps on the bike, but he led for the majority of the race before finishing the race in fifth despite having to try to adjust the handlebars of the bike while racing. Sofuoğlu remained with the team in 2011, riding one of the team's Suters. His best finish was 2nd place at Assen.

Injuries
During training for the 2017 Supersport World Championship in early February, Sofuoğlu broke a finger bone. He had to undergo two operations. Just before the first round of the championship in Australia, he performed a two-day test, but was not ready to race because of pain when braking, and decided not to start. He flew back home to undergo another operation, and stated that he would miss the opening two rounds, but would be present again in Spain, the third round of the championship.

On 30 September Sofuoğlu broke his pelvis in three places after a crash during the Superpole session of a championship race in France. The same day, he was flown to Istanbul, Turkey for medical care by air ambulance. His doctor stated that Sofuğlu could be discharged from the hospital in 5–6 weeks if everything went right. Sofuoğlu confirmed the recovery period as 12 weeks.

After a period of only five weeks he returned to participate in the last meeting at Qatar, finishing the race in third place and totalling points for second place the championship.

Sofuoglu announced his retirement from racing on the build-up to the fifth round of the 2018 season at Imola after sustaining another injury at Phillip Island. This is in addition to a crash at Magny-Cours in the previous year, when he suffered a hip injury.

Career statistics

Supersport World Championship

Races by year
(key) (Races in bold indicate pole position; races in italics indicate fastest lap)

Superbike World Championship

By season

Races by year
(key) (Races in bold indicate pole position, races in italics indicate fastest lap)

Grand Prix motorcycle racing

By season

By class

Races by year
(key) (Races in bold indicate pole position, races in italics indicate fastest lap)

Politics
Sofuoğlu was elected in June 2018 as a Justice and Development Party (AK Party) parliamentarian for the Sakarya Province.

On 4 July 2018, the Turkish parliament's opening day for the 2018–2019 session, Sofuoğlu arrived driving a Lamborghini Aventador, which he parked in a space reserved for an opposition deputy. This drew criticism about the "luxury car" but Sofuoğlu—who also owns two Mercedes SUVs, a Ferrari, and a Fiat 124—responded that the critics have taken aim at him because of his party affiliation and the car was only an excuse. Sofuoğlu has stated he gives his elected deputy's salary to charity.

Personal life
Sofuoğlu is the third child of İrfan Basri Sofuoğlu and his wife Nurhayat. He has one sister and two brothers. His father is a motorcycle repairman with his own garage. Two of Sofuoğlu's brothers, who were also local motorcycle racers, have died in accidents. Sofuoğlu's eldest brother Bahattin, himself a domestic Turkish motorcycling champion, died in a traffic accident in 2002. His next eldest brother Sinan died during a race training incident at the İzmit Körfez Circuit in May 2008.

Sofuoğlu speaks German, French, English and Turkish. Sofuoğlu is a practising Muslim, and observes daytime fasting during Ramadan. His bike number 54 stems from his home town's (Sakarya Province in Turkey) license plate number. He has noted that his riding style uses too much upper-body effort, causing him to tire on the bike.

On 3 September 2014 he married Julia Looman, after a two-year engagement. After the wedding ceremony in his hometown Sakarya, the couple flew to Barcelona, Spain.

On 14 March 2015 Kenan Sofuoğlu became the father of a son named Hamza, who was born in the Netherlands. On 2 May 2015 the infant suffered a cerebral hemorrhage during a family holiday in Alanya. He was transferred to Istanbul, and underwent surgery. Hamza died on 25 July 2015, aged four months, and was buried in the family grave at Akyazı, Sakarya.

Since then, the couple has welcomed three more children into the world. Mahir Sofuoglu, born 19 April 2016, Zayn Sofuoglu, born 4 November 2019, and Lila Sofuoglu, born 26 May 2021.

See also
 Sofuoğlu family

References

External links

1983 births
Living people
People from Akyazı
Turkish motorcycle racers
Supersport World Championship riders
Turkish Sunni Muslims
Moto2 World Championship riders
Superbike World Championship riders
FIM Superstock 1000 Cup riders
Turkish sportsmen
Kenan
Members of the 27th Parliament of Turkey
Justice and Development Party (Turkey) politicians
Deputies of Sakarya
Turkish sportsperson-politicians